Adelphi University is a private university in Garden City, New York. Adelphi also has centers in Manhattan, Hudson Valley, and Suffolk County. There is also a virtual, online campus for remote students. It is the oldest institution of higher education in suburban Long Island. It enrolls 7,859 undergraduate and graduate students.

History

Adelphi College
Adelphi University began with the Adelphi Academy, founded in Brooklyn, New York, in 1863. The academy was a private preparatory school located at 412 Adelphi Street, in the Fort Greene neighborhood of Brooklyn, but later moved to Clinton Hill. It was formally chartered in 1869 by the board of trustees of the City of Brooklyn for establishing "a first class institution for the broadest and most thorough training, and to make its advantages as accessible as possible to the largest numbers of our population." One of the teachers at the Adelphi Academy was Harlan Fiske Stone, who later served as the Chief Justice of the United States.

In 1893, Dr. Charles Herbert Levermore was appointed as the head of Adelphi Academy. Seeking to establish a liberal arts college for the City of Brooklyn, Levermore received a charter from the Board of Regents of the State of New York, officially establishing Adelphi College on June 24, 1896. The college received its charter through the efforts of Timothy Woodruff, former Lieutenant Governor of New York and future first president of the board of trustees. Adelphi was one of the first coeducational institutions to receive a charter from the State of New York. At the time of its foundation, the college numbered only 57 students and 16 instructors. The Adelphi Academy continued to exist as a separate but nonetheless connected entity to the college. The new college was located in a building behind the Adelphi Academy, on the corner of St. James's Place and Clifton Place, in Brooklyn. The building that originally housed Adelphi is now used by Pratt Institute for their School of Architecture.

In 1912, Adelphi became a women's college. In 1922, the school raised over one million dollars to expand the overcrowded facilities in Brooklyn. In 1925, Adelphi College severed its ties with the Adelphi Academy, the latter closing in 1930. In 1929, the college moved from its founding location in Brooklyn to the current location of its main campus in Garden City, New York. The original "academy" continues to function as a P–12 school in Brooklyn. The original three buildings of the Garden City campus, Levermore Hall, Blodgett Hall and Woodruff Hall, were designed by McKim, Mead and White. 

In 1938, the Dance Program was founded by the world-famous dancer Ruth St. Denis. In 1943, the School of Nursing was established in response to the need for nurses due to American involvement in World War II. First Lady Eleanor Roosevelt presided over the opening of two federally funded residence halls on campus, in a speech entitled "The Challenge of Nursing for Young Women Today."

In 1946, after World War II ended, Adelphi reverted to a coeducational college and started admitting new students on the federal GI Bill. New sports teams were created following the readmission of men to the school. In 1952, the first program for clinical psychology was established at the school; it was the forerunner to the Institute for Advanced Psychological Studies, now the Gordon F. Derner School of Psychology.

Adelphi University
In 1963, the New York State Board of Regents granted the college university status, and the name was changed to Adelphi University. In 1964, the School of Business was founded. In 1966, the Institute for Advanced Psychological Studies was founded. In 1973, the university established ABLE (Adult Baccalaureate Learning Experience) for the education of adults. Now known as the College of Professional and Continuing Studies, it was one of the earliest programs created for nontraditional students. In 1984, the Institute for Teaching and Educational Studies was founded; it became the School of Education in 1990. In 1993, the Society of Mentors was established, giving students faculty advisors that they could consult on an as-needed basis to assist them in their studies. In 1995, the Honors College was founded.

In January 1963, Adelphi Suffolk College (which had started out in 1955 offering extension courses in Suffolk County, New York) purchased the former W.K. Vanderbilt estate in Oakdale, New York. In 1968, it was spun off to Dowling College after its chief benefactor, Robert Dowling.

Adelphi faced a serious scandal in 1996, as the school celebrated its 100th anniversary. University president Peter Diamandopoulos and the board of trustees were accused of neglect of duty, misconduct and failure to carry out the educational purposes of Adelphi. The New York State Board of Regents was called in to investigate; Diamandopoulos, along with all but one of the board of trustees, was dismissed from office. The university was in dire financial straits until Dr. Robert A. Scott was installed in the position of President in 2000. Scott saved the school by decreasing tuition, increasing scholarships offered for the students, and launching an advertising campaign to increase enrollment. Since that time, the school has surpassed many of its previous gains, and is said to be undergoing a new renaissance. Adelphi University has been ranked as a "Best Buy" college by the Fiske Guide to Colleges for the last ten years for its quality education offered at a comparatively affordable price. Adelphi University also participates in the National Association of Independent Colleges and Universities's (NAICU) University and College Accountability Network (U-CAN). In 2023, the Princeton Review ranked Adelphi University a "Green College" making the list of environmentally responsible colleges and universities across the country.

College and university presidents

Adelphi College
 Charles H. Levermore, 1896–1912
 S. Parkes Cadman, 1912–1915 (interim)
 Frank D. Blodgett, 1915–1937
 Paul Dawson Eddy, 1937–1963

Adelphi University

 Paul Dawson Eddy, 1963–1965
 Arthur Brown, 1965–1967
 Robert Olmsted, 1967–1969
 Charles Vevier, 1969–1971
 Randall McIntyre, 1971–1972
 Timothy Costello, 1972–1985
 Peter Diamandopoulos, 1985–1997
 Igor Webb, 1997
 James A. Norton, 1997–1998
 Matthew Goldstein, 1998–1999
 Steven L. Isenberg, 1999–2000
 Robert A. Scott, 2000–2015
 Christine Riordan, 2015–Present

Breast cancer support program

The university's School of Social Work is home to the Adelphi New York Statewide Breast Cancer Hotline and Support Program, which marks its 30th anniversary in 2010. The program began in 1980 as the Woman-to-Woman Hotline, a free and confidential service to help women with breast cancer. It is the second oldest breast cancer hotline in the United States; over 100 trained volunteers offer information and emotional support for women and men suffering from breast cancer. There are professional social workers, bi-lingual Spanish-speaking staff and support staff, along with support groups, educational programs and individual counseling.

Academics

Rankings

In 2015, Adelphi University was ranked #17 in New York State by average professor salaries.

Colleges, schools and degrees
 College of Arts and Sciences: B.A., B.S., B.F.A., M.A., M.S., M.F.A.,
 College of Professional and Continuing Studies: A.A., A.S., A.A.S., B.A., B.S., Post-baccalaureate Certificate, M.S.
 Gordon F. Derner School of Psychology: B.A., M.A., M.S., Ph.D., Psy.D.
 Ruth S. Ammon School of Education: B.A., B.S., M.A., Advanced Certificates, Au.D., Ph.D.
 Robert B Willumstad School of Business: B.S., B.A., B.B.A., M.S., M.B.A., M.S./M.B.A. (with School of Nursing).
 College of Nursing and Public Health: B.S., M.S., M.S./M.B.A. (with School of Business), Ph.D.
 School of Social Work: B.S.W., M.S.W., D.S.W., Ph.D.
 Honors College

On February 27, 2012, president Robert A. Scott announced a gift of $9.5 million from Adelphi Board of Trustees Chairman Robert B. Willumstad '05 (Hon.). The Adelphi University School of Business, established in 1964, was renamed the Robert B. Willumstad School of Business in his honor.

Joint degree programs
 Dentistry: New York University College of Dentistry (3–4 B.S./D.D.S.)
 Engineering: Columbia University,(3–2 B.A./B.S.)
 Environmental Studies: Columbia University (3–2 B.A./B.S. or 4–2 B.A./M.S.)
 Optometry: SUNY State College of Optometry (3–4 B.S./O.D.)
 Osteopathic Medicine: Touro College of Osteopathic Medicine (3–4 B.S./D.O.)
 Physical Therapy: New York Medical College (4–3 B.S./D.P.T.)

International programs
Adelphi has partnerships with outside providers who offer study abroad opportunities to students in approximately 120 countries.

For semester and academic year direct exchanges with Adelphi partners, students can use 100% of their federal and institutional aid. For programs that are not directly associated with Adelphi, but are from accredited institutions and are approved by the Center for International Education, students can use all of their federal aid, and 75% of their Adelphi institutional aid—all while remaining enrolled there on campus. Adelphi faculty-led programs, including theater, art, art history, literature, history, counseling, chemistry and speech-pathology, are held in Italy, Kenya, Denmark, Norway, Finland, Iceland, England, Jamaica, Kosovo and Poland.

Levermore Global Scholars program is an innovative academic community dedicated to preparing students to become global thinkers and leaders in a changing world. Students engage through classroom study, events and conferences at the United Nations and study abroad.

Main campus buildings

Main halls

Many of the buildings on the Garden City campus are symmetrical in nature. This is likely because garden cities are typically planned symmetrically. For example, Woodruff Hall has a second chimney solely to preserve the symmetry of the building.
 Alice Brown Early Learning Center

 Alumnae Hall
 Angello Alumni House
 Center for Recreation and Sports (home gym of Panthers volleyball and basketball)
 Blodgett Hall
 Hagedorn Hall of Enterprise (School of Business)
 Harvey Hall (School of Education)
 The Hy Weinberg Center (Institute for Advanced Psychological Studies)
 Klapper Center for Fine Arts
 Levermore Hall
 Nexus Building and Welcome Center (College of Nursing and Public Health)
 Performing Arts Center, which now includes the Olmsted Theatre
 Post Hall
 The Science Building
 The Social Work Building
 Swirbul Library
 The Ruth S. Harley University Center (the Center's addition opened January 2021)
 Woodruff Hall

Residence halls

 Chapman Hall
 Earle Hall
 Eddy Hall
 Linen Hall
 Residence Hall A
 Residence Hall B
 Waldo Hall

Student organizations

Recognized men's fraternities

 Alpha Phi Alpha
 Delta Chi
 Iota Nu Delta
 Kappa Sigma
 Phi Sigma Kappa
 Pi Lambda Phi
 Lambda Upsilon Lambda

Recognized sororities and women's fellowships

 Alpha Epsilon Phi
 Alpha Kappa Alpha
 Delta Delta Delta
 Delta Gamma
 Delta Phi Epsilon
 Delta Sigma Theta
 Phi Mu
 Phi Sigma Sigma
 Sigma Delta Tau
 Sigma Lambda Upsilon
 Swing Phi Swing

Recognized professional fraternity
 Delta Sigma Pi

Athletics

The Adelphi Panthers are the athletic teams of Adelphi University. The Panthers compete at the NCAA Division II level for all sports and have been a member of the Northeast-10 Conference since 2009.

The Panthers have won 18 NCAA Division II National Championships in three different sports. The men's lacrosse team has won seven national crowns, their last coming in 2001. The women's lacrosse team has won an NCAA Division II-record ten, including three consecutive National Championships in 2009, 2010, 2011 and back-to-back titles in 2014 and 2015; and most recently in 2019. In 1974, the men's soccer team were the National Champions. They have also won numerous individual national championships in track and field.

Since transitioning to the Northeast-10, the Adelphi Panthers have become a powerhouse in the East Region. In 2013, just their fourth year in the conference, the Panthers were awarded the 2013 Northeast-10 Presidents' Cup. The Presidents' Cup is presented annually to signify overall athletic excellence in the Northeast-10. The honor is awarded to the institution that compiles the most total points from all of its programs competing in league championships.

Notable alumni

 Gary Dell'Abate ("Baba Booey") (b. 1961) – producer of The Howard Stern Show
 John D. Wren – President, CEO, and Chairman Omnicom Group
Joe Abbenda (b. 1939) – former Mr America and Mr Universe
 Chris Armas (b. 1972) – professional soccer player, Chicago Fire of Major League Soccer and Adelphi women's soccer coach
 Michael Balboni (b. 1959) – Deputy Secretary for Public Safety for the State of New York
 Bob Beamon (b. 1946) – American track and field athlete, world record holder in long jump
 Ron Bruder – entrepreneur who runs Middle East education non-profits, named on the Time 100
 Melanie Chartoff – actress and comedienne
 Chuck Connors – athlete and actor
 Nick Cummings – Ph.D. past president of the American Psychological Association and founding board chairman of Care Integra, and author
 Chuck D (Carlton Ridenhour; b. 1960) – musician, author, lecturer, founder and frontman of the hip-hop group Public Enemy
 Vyvyan Donner – fashion editor, film director, screenwriter, theatrical costume designer and caricaturist 
 Meredith Eaton-Gilden – psychotherapist and actress
 Paul Ekman – psychologist
 Clara Fasano – sculptor
 Flavor Flav – rapper, member of rap group Public Enemy
 Ida M. Flynn (1942–2004), American computer scientist, textbook author, and professor
 John Forslund – television play-by-play announcer for the Carolina Hurricanes of the NHL
 Karen Fraction – Broadway dancer and actress
 Charles J. Fuschillo, Jr. – New York State Senator, 8th District
 Arie Gill-Glick – Israeli Olympic runner
 Wes Green – professional lacrosse player, Los Angeles Riptide of Major League Lacrosse, and San Jose Stealth of National Lacrosse League
 Alexander Greendale – playwright and civic leader
 Sean Hannity – Fox News host.
 Alice Hoffman – author
 Earlene Hill Hooper – New York State Assembly Assemblywoman, 18th District
 Jonathan Larson – creator of the Broadway musical Rent
 Michael Lindsay – actor and voice artist
 Suzanne Luna – producer and director on The Ellen DeGeneres Show
 Gee Malik Linton – director and screenwriter
 Leona Marlin-Romeo – 5th Prime Minister of Sint Maarten
 Gregory W. Meeks – congressman from New York, 6th District
 Sal Mineo, Actor, Academy Award Nominee
 Donna Orender (née Geils; born 1957) – women's pro basketball league all-star and former WNBA president
 Carmen Ortiz – former U.S. Attorney for the District of Massachusetts
 Billy Phillips – professional soccer player and coach
 Chad Prince (b. 1979) - professional soccer player and coach 
 Ron Robinson – chemist
Dinelia Rosa - psychologist and professor
 Rony Schneider - Israeli professional soccer player
 Erin Stern - IFBB fitness professional and figure competitor 
 Gary Sullivan – USL professional soccer player, Long Island Rough Riders
 Helen Rand Thayer (1863-1935), social reformer
 Al Trautwig – sports announcer, member of the Adelphi Athletics Hall of Fame
 Mary L. Trump – psychologist and author, niece of Donald J. Trump
 Rebecca Tobey – sculptor
 Edolphus Towns (b. 1934) – congressman from New York, 10th District
 Steven Vincent – Broadway choreographer, dancer, and teacher
 Max Weinberg (b. 1951) - drummer and television personality
 Robert B. Willumstad – chairman and CEO, American International Group
 Mike Windischmann (b. 1965) – soccer, captain of the 1990 United States World Cup team
 Theresa Wolfson (1897-1972) – labor economist and educator, won the John Dewey Award of the League for Industrial Democracy
 Jacqueline Woodson (b. 1963) – author of children's literature
 Roby Young (b. 1942) - Israeli international soccer player, and captain of Hapoel Haifa

Notable faculty 

 Al Davis (1929–2011), former line coach for the Adelphi College football team 1950–51
 Loren Hightower (1927-2017) – dancer, Metropolitan Ballet, American Ballet Theatre, and Agnes de Mille Dance Theatre; regular performer with the Metropolitan Opera and Broadway musicals
 Allen Krebs, sacked for expressing political views in class and went on to found the Free University of New York
 William Cranston Lawton (1853–1941), professor of Greek
 Jerry March (1929–1997), organic chemist and professor of chemistry; authored March's Advanced Organic Chemistry text
 Paul Mattick Jr. (b. 1944), professor and chair of philosophy. Author of Business as Usual: The Economic Crisis and the Failure of Capitalism. Son of Paul Mattick Sr.
 Paul Moravec, 2004 Pulitzer Prize winner in music composition
 Frances Perkins, professor of sociology, Labor Secretary under Franklin D. Roosevelt
 Lawrence Raphael, professor of communication sciences and disorders
Ruth Westheimer (born Karola Siegel, 1928; known as "Dr. Ruth") German-American sex therapist, talk show host, author, professor, Holocaust survivor, and former Haganah sniper.

See also
 WBAU – former student-operated radio station that broadcast on 90.3 FM.

References

External links

 
 Official athletic website

 
Private universities and colleges in New York (state)
Educational institutions established in 1896
McKim, Mead & White buildings
Universities and colleges on Long Island
Universities and colleges in Nassau County, New York
Liberal arts colleges in New York (state)
1896 establishments in New York (state)